Nemisio Guillot is credited with bringing the first bat and baseball to Cuba in 1864 after being schooled at Spring Hill College in Mobile, Alabama. 

By 1868, Nemisio along with his brother Ernesto, and a number of their contemporaries had founded a baseball team called the Habana Base Ball Club. That club allegedly defeated the crew of an American schooner anchored at the Matanzas's harbor for repairs. However, the team did not have much time to celebrate this exploit and actually had to go underground because the Ten Years' War broke out and the Spanish colonial authorities outlawed the game.

See also
 Baseball in Cuba

References
 Baseball Around the World

19th-century baseball players
Cuban baseball players
Year of birth missing
Year of death missing